Ibsheway or Ebshawai is a city in Faiyum Governorate, Egypt.

References

Populated places in Faiyum Governorate